Brazos Valley is a region of the U.S. state of Texas comprising the following 7 counties in Central Texas: Brazos, Burleson, and Robertson (which collectively comprise the Bryan–College Station metropolitan area), and the neighboring counties of Grimes, Leon, Madison, and Washington.

The area is centered on Brazos County, the cities of College Station and Bryan, and Texas A&M University. The Brazos River lies at the center of the region; however, not all areas of the region are a part of the Brazos drainage basin.

The Brazos Valley Council of Governments represents the collective interests of the local governments in the region.

The Brazos Valley Museum of Natural History maintains collections in the fields of archaeology, botany, conchology, cultural history, geology, mammalogy, ornithology, and paleontology in the region.

References

Regions of Texas
Brazos River
Geography of Brazos County, Texas
Geography of Robertson County, Texas
Geography of Grimes County, Texas
Geography of Washington County, Texas
Geography of Burleson County, Texas
Geography of Madison County, Texas
Geography of Leon County, Texas